Microtropis is a genus of plant in family Celastraceae. There are about 70 species. They are trees and shrubs, evergreen or deciduous, with oppositely arranged leaves and white or yellowish flowers. Microtropis are distributed in Asia, Africa, and Central America.

Species include:
 Microtropis argentea Kochummen
 Microtropis borneensis Merr. & Freeman
 Microtropis densiflora Wight
 Microtropis fascicularis Kochummen
 Microtropis keningauensis Kochummen
 Microtropis rigida Ridl.
 Microtropis sabahensis Kochummen
 Microtropis sarawakensis Kochummen
 Microtropis tenuis Symington
 Microtropis wallichiana Wight ex Thwaites
 Microtropis zeylanica Merr. & Freeman

References

 
Celastrales genera
Taxonomy articles created by Polbot